The Democratic Party leadership election was held on 1 December 2002 for the 30-member 5th Central Committee of the Democratic Party in Hong Kong, including chairman and two vice-chairman posts. Incumbent vice-chairman was elected as chairman uncontestedly, succeeding founding chairman Martin Lee Chu-ming.

Eligibility
The Central Committee was elected by the party congress. All public office holders, including the members of the Legislative Council and District Councils, are eligible to vote in the party congress. Every 30 members can also elect a delegate who holds one vote in the congress.

Overview
Founding chairman Martin Lee stepped down according to the four-term limit. There was only Yeung Sum's team contested for the posts. Yeung Sum received 121 votes for and 9 votes against, 2 more votes against him than Martin Lee in 2000. Albert Ho Chun-yan and Lee Wing-tat elected as Vice-Chairmen, receiving 132 and 129 votes of confidence respectively. Albert Chan Wai-yip, the pro-grassroots "radical" legislator for the New Territories West constituency quit the party as he said he would if Yeung Sum became chairman.

After the election, Yeung Sum said since the party was marginalised by Beijing, the Democratic Party was accused of playing negative role in the "one country, two systems" and unification with Taiwan. Therefore, his task would be establishing normal relationship with the central and also SAR governments, and forming solidarity within the party.

The elected members of the 5th Central Committee are listed as following:
Chairman: Yeung Sum
Vice-Chairmen: Albert Ho, Lee Wing-tat
Secretary: Cheung Yin-tung
Treasurer: Tsui Hon-kwong
Executive committee members:

 Chan King-ming
 Chan Ka-wai
 Josephine Chan Shu-ying
 Cheung Man-kwong
 Law Chi-kwong
 Ng Wing-fai
 Szeto Wah

Central committee members:

 Cheung Wing-fai
 Cheung Yuet-lan
 Chow Wai-tung
 Ho Wai-to
 Hui Kei-cheung
 Kwan Wing-yip
 Law Chun-ngai
 Joanna Leung Suk-ching
 Mark Li Kin-yin
 Ma Kei
 Sin Chung-kai
 James To Kun-sun
 Wong Leung-hi
 Wong Sing-chi
 Zachary Wong Wai-yin
 Wu Chi-wai
 Yeung Sik-pik
 Yuen Bun-keung

References

Political party leadership elections in Hong Kong
Democratic Party (Hong Kong)
2002 in Hong Kong
2002 elections in China
Democratic Party (HK) leadership election